Woh Pagal Si is a Pakistani drama series that airs on ARY Digital, written by Sadia Akhtar, directed by Faisal Bukhari and produced by Humayun Saeed and Shahzad Nasib under the banner of Six Sigma Plus. It features Hira Khan, Omer Shahzad, Saad Qureshi, Zubab Rana and Babar Ali in lead roles.

Plot
The story of the play revolves around the life of a girl named Sara. She tries to save Ahsan (her father) from his second wife, she faces many difficulties.she married to her driver sabir Son's named zaheen. Zaheen loves Sara but she didn't want to accept zaheen's love but after some difficulties and sequence of events .she also started loving zaheen.

Cast 

 Hira Khan as Sara Ahsan Hayat/ Sara Zaheen Ahmed 
Zara Ahmed as Bela Ahsan Hayat/Bela Sarim (Sara's eldest sister) and married to Sarim living in Dubai UAE
Adnan Saeed as Sarim (Bela Ahsan Hayat's husband and brother in law to Sara)
 Omer Shahzad as Wahaj Haider (Shazma's boyfriend)
 Zubab Rana as Shazma Mazhar Hussain/Mrs. Shazma Ahsan Hayat, Ahsan Hayat's wife and Bela and Sara stepmom 
 Saad Qureshi as Zaheen Ahmed (Sara Ahsan Hayat's husband)
 Babar Ali as Ahsan Hayat, Shazma husband and Bela and Sara father.
 Anam Tanveer as Shabana Anwar (Zaheen sister in Law)
 Ismail Tara as Sabir (Zaheen father)
 Farah Nadeem as Zohra (Shazma mother)
 Shazia Gohar as Zulekha (Zaheen mother) 
 Sohail Masood as Police Officer 
 Abdullah Javed as Rumi (Sara's University fellow and boyfriend)
 Birjees Farooqui as Rumi's mother (She is a widow and lives with her son)
 Fouzia Mushtaq as Bela and Sara Guardian. She currently away on a six months leave. 
 Areej Chaudhary as Sajo (Shabana younger sister and interests in Zaheen.
 Talat Shah as Anwar Ahmed (Zaheen eldest brother, Shabana husband, brother in law to Sajo).

References 

2022 Pakistani television series debuts